Sandtown-Winchester is a neighborhood in West Baltimore, Maryland. Known locally as Sandtown, the community's name was derived from the trails of sand that dropped from wagons leaving town after filling up at the local sand and gravel quarry back in the days of horse-drawn wagons. It is located north of Lafayette Street, west of Fremont Avenue, south of North Avenue, and east of Monroe Street, covering an area of 72 square blocks, patrolled by the Baltimore Police Department's Western District. The community is 98.5% black.

History
Sandtown is located in a historically black area of West Baltimore neighboring the once affluent Upton. In the second half of the 20th century, Sandtown experienced economic depression, housing abandonment, crime, and the effects of the Baltimore riot of 1968.  Whereas in the 1950s and 1960s famous African American performers such as Billie Holiday and Diana Ross performed there and it was sometimes referred to as Baltimore's Harlem, by the time of the 2015 protests and rioting over the death of Freddie Gray, 3% of its population was incarcerated, a third of its housing abandoned, 20% of working age people were unemployed, and a third of residents were living in poverty.

In 2015 Wall Street Journal op-ed columnist William Galston drew lessons from the history of Port Clinton, Ohio, to Baltimore and reported  52% unemployment among 16 to 64 year-olds in the Sandtown-Winchester neighborhood, twice the unemployment rate of Baltimore as a whole.

Schools
Gilmor Elementary School, grades Pre-k to 5
New Song Academy, grades Pre-k to 8
William Pinderhughes Elementary/Middle School, grades Pre-k to 8
Youth Opportunity Academy, grades 9 to 12

Notable people
Cab Calloway, late jazz great
Gervonta Davis, world champion boxer
Ethel Ennis, jazz singer
Billie Holiday, jazz singer
Thurgood Marshall, first African-American justice on the Supreme Court of the United States
Melvin Williams aka "Little Melvin", former drug lord of Baltimore
Davante Harrison (rapper) YGG Tay, serving 15 years for drug conspiracy

See also
 List of Baltimore neighborhoods

Notes

 
African-American history in Baltimore
Neighborhoods in Baltimore
Poverty in Maryland
Working-class culture in Baltimore